Day-Lewis is a surname, and may refer to:

 Cecil Day-Lewis (1904-1972), English poet
 Daniel Day-Lewis (born 1957), Academy Award-winning and Golden Globe-award nominated English actor
 Frank Day-Lewis (1872-1938), Church of Ireland priest; father of Cecil Day-Lewis
 Tamasin Day-Lewis (born 1954), English television chef

Compound surnames